The House That Ate The Hamptons is a novel based on the controversy surrounding the construction of billionaire Ira Rennert's mansion in Sagaponack, New York.

The novel's author, James Brady, was a magazine writer with columns in Parade magazine and Advertising Age. He was also a part-time Hamptons resident.

Sources 

 The House that Ate the Hamptons. James Brady
 The New York Times, December 18, 2008,

External links 

The Daily Telegraph, 5 June 2001, 'Long Island: Heading for the Hamptons', 

2000 American novels
Novels set in Long Island
Southampton (town), New York